Uroloba fuscicostata is a moth of the family Pterophoridae. It is known from Chile.

The wingspan is 21–24 mm. Adults are on wing in October, November and December.

External links

Pterophorinae
Moths described in 1891
Taxa named by Thomas de Grey, 6th Baron Walsingham
Moths of South America
Endemic fauna of Chile